Actinopoda may refer to two different taxonomic groups:
 Actinopoda, Ludwig 1891, a subclass of sea cucumbers
 Actinopoda, Calkins 1909, a major historical grouping of amoeba that included Radiolarians and Heliozoans